New York's 86th State Assembly district is one of the 150 districts in the New York State Assembly. It has been represented by Democrat Yudelka Tapia since 2021.

Geography
District 86 is located in The Bronx, comprising University Heights, Morris Heights, Mount Eden, Kingsbridge, Tremont and Fordham.

Recent election results

2022

2021 special

2020

2018

2016

2014

2013 special

2012

2010

2008

References

86